Sihwa Lake Tidal Power Station is the world's largest tidal power installation, with a total power output capacity of 254 MW. When completed in 2011, it surpassed the 240 MW Rance Tidal Power Station which was the world's largest for 45 years. It is operated by the Korea Water Resources Corporation.

Design
The tidal barrage makes use of a seawall constructed in 1994 for flood mitigation and agricultural purposes. 
Ten 25.4 MW submerged bulb turbines are driven in an unpumped flood generation scheme; power is generated on tidal inflows only, and the outflow is sluiced away, i.e. as one-way power generation. This slightly unconventional and relatively inefficient approach has been chosen to balance a complex mix of existing land use, water use, conservation, environmental and power generation considerations.

Construction
The power station was built in 2011 and started to operate in 2012. The project cost US$560 million was borne by the South Korean Government.

Environmental context
After the seawall was built in 1994, pollution built up in the newly created Sihwa Lake reservoir, making its water useless for agriculture. Concentrations of perfluorooctane sulfonate (PFOS) measured in Lake Sihwa were among the greatest ever measured in the environment. In January 2003, PFOS had been found at 730 ng/L in Lake Shihwa water.

In 2004, seawater was reintroduced in the hope of flushing out contamination; inflows from the tidal barrage were envisaged as a complementary permanent solution. As of 2007 the power station was planned to provide this indirect environmental benefit, as well as renewable energy.

Picture

See also 

 List of largest power stations in the world
 List of power stations in South Korea
 List of tidal power stations

Notes

References 
World’s Largest Tidal Power Plant–Shihwa Lake in Korea http://energy.korea.com/archives/6887 

Energy infrastructure completed in 2011
Tidal power stations in South Korea
Tidal barrages
Buildings and structures in Gyeonggi Province